He Was... She Was... You Was... We Was... is a live album by former Family/Streetwalkers frontman Roger Chapman recorded during the Germany Live tour end of 1981 and released in 1982.

Track listing

Personnel
Roger Chapman - vocals, harmonica
 Boz Burrell — bass
 Tim Hinkley — piano, organ, vocals
 Poli Palmer — synthesizer (CMI Fairlight), vibraphone
 Nick Pentelow — saxophone
 Steve Simpson — guitar, mandolin, violin, vocals
 Leonard "Stretch" Stretching — drums
 Geoff Whitehorn — guitar, vocals

References

External links
 

Roger Chapman albums
1982 live albums